Syren is a small town in the commune of Weiler-la-Tour, in southern Luxembourg.  , the town had a population of 416 people.

Syren is the source of the Syre river, which flows down to the Moselle, through some of Luxembourg's wealthiest districts.

In 2003, there was a fire which destroyed 4 homes. A similar fire happened in the summer of 2014, destroying one chalet.

References 

Luxembourg (canton)
Towns in Luxembourg